The Train of Pantanal (Portuguese, Trem do Pantanal) is a railway in the state of Mato Grosso do Sul, Brazil that passes through the Pantanal region. It begins in the city of Campo Grande and ends in Corumbá, a total distance of 420 km. It is sometimes referred to as the Train of Death.

History
The line was inaugurated in 1914 and was finished in 1950. The government plans on reconstructing the train slowly by 2009, although it was initially predicted to be completed by 2005.

References

Metre gauge railways in Brazil
Transport in Mato Grosso do Sul
Pantanal